The Henan Provincial Library, also known as the Henan Library, is a Zhengzhou-based provincial-level public library, located at 150 South Songshan Road, Zhengzhou City, Henan Province. It is the largest public library in Henan, with a total cumulative collection of 3.1 million books (pieces).

Henan Provincial Library was officially opened to the public in February 1909 and is one of the earlier provincial public libraries in China.

History
Henan Provincial Library was officially opened in a family Ancestral Hall in Kaifeng on the eighth day of February in the lunar calendar of the first year of the Xuantong (i.e. 27 February 1909 AD).

References

Libraries in China
Buildings and structures in Henan
Libraries established in 1909